Gábor Zsiborás (12 November 1957 – 7 September 1993) was a Hungarian professional footballer who played as a goalkeeper.

Career statistics

Club

Notes

International

References

External links
 
 

1957 births
1993 deaths
Hungarian footballers
Hungary international footballers
Association football goalkeepers
Nemzeti Bajnokság I players
Ferencvárosi TC footballers
MTK Budapest FC players
Footballers from Budapest